Force Majeure is the sixth studio album by the Swedish hard rock group H.E.A.T. It is the band's first album since 2010's Freedom Rock to feature original vocalist Kenny Leckremo.  H.E.A.T announced his return in October 2020 after the departure of previous vocalist Erik Grönwall. On 12 December 2020 the band released an alternate version of the song "Rise" from their previous album H.E.A.T II with Leckremo on vocals. The first single from the album, "Nationwide", was released on 25 March 2022. "Back to the Rhythm" was chosen as the second single and was released on 8 April 2022.

Track listing

Personnel
 Kenny Leckremo – lead vocals
 Dave Dalone – guitar
 Jona Tee – keyboards
 Jimmy Jay – bass
 Don Crash – drums

Charts

References

2022 albums
H.E.A.T albums